Events in the year 1948 in Costa Rica.

Incumbents
President: Teodoro Picado Michalski until April 20, Santos León Herrera (interim) until May 8, José Figueres Ferrer

Events
February 8 - Costa Rican general election, 1948
March 12-April 24: Costa Rican Civil War
December 8 - Costa Rican Constitutional Assembly election, 1948

Births

Deaths

References

 
1940s in Costa Rica
Years of the 20th century in Costa Rica
Costa Rica
Costa Rican